In enzymology, a leucine dehydrogenase is an enzyme that catalyzes the chemical reaction

L-leucine + H2O + NAD+  4-methyl-2-oxopentanoate + NH3 + NADH + H+

The 3 substrates of this enzyme are L-leucine, H2O, and NAD+, whereas its 4 products are 4-methyl-2-oxopentanoate, NH3, NADH, and H+.

This enzyme belongs to the family of oxidoreductases, specifically those acting on the CH-NH2 group of donors with NAD+ or NADP+ as acceptor.  The systematic name of this enzyme class is L-leucine:NAD+ oxidoreductase (deaminating). Other names in common use include L-leucine dehydrogenase, L-leucine:NAD+ oxidoreductase, deaminating, and LeuDH.  This enzyme participates in valine, leucine and isoleucine degradation and valine, leucine and isoleucine biosynthesis.

Structural studies

As of late 2007, only one structure has been solved for this class of enzymes, with the PDB accession code .

References

 
 

EC 1.4.1
NADH-dependent enzymes
Enzymes of known structure